The Camera Never Lies is a jazz vocal album by Michael Franks, released in 1987 by Warner Bros. Records.

Track listing

Personnel

 Michael Franksbanjo, guitar, mandolin, vocals
 Randy Breckertrumpet
 Lew Solofftrumpet
 Bill Evanstenor saxophone
 Lawrence Feldmanalto saxophone
 Michael BreckerEWI, tenor saxophone
 Rob Mounseyflute, keyboard bass, keyboards, background vocals
 Clifford Carterpiano, synthesizer
 Richard Teepiano
 Michal Urbaniakviolin
 Hiram Bullockguitar
 Cornell Dupreeguitar
 Steve Khanguitar
 Earl Klughguitar
 Jeff Mironovguitar
 Georg Wadeniusguitar
 Mark Eganbass
 Neil Jasonbass
 Will Leebass, background vocals
 Marcus Millerbass
 Robin Goulddrums
 Steve Jordandrums
 Chris Parkercymbals, drums
 Dave Weckldrums
 Ralph MacDonaldcongas, percussion
 Roger Squiterocaxixi, shekere
 Patti Austinvocals, background vocals
 Kacey Cisykbackground vocals
 Art Garfunkelbackground vocals
 Lani Grovesbackground vocals

Charts

References

Michael Franks (musician) albums
1987 albums
Warner Records albums
Albums produced by Rob Mounsey